Chansons is a 2003 album by Élie Semoun.

Track list 
 Mademoiselle A
 Vous
 La minute de silence
 La chanson idéale
 Carte postale
 Abécédaire
 Le secret
 Emma
 C'était bien
 Le bonheur
 Imbécile heureux
 Les pommes de terre à la bechamelle

References

2003 albums